The 2002 Missouri Valley Conference men's basketball tournament was played from March 1-4, 2002 at the Savvis Center in St. Louis, Missouri at the conclusion of the 2001–2002 regular season. The Creighton Bluejays won their 7th MVC tournament title to earn an automatic bid to the 2002 NCAA tournament.

Tournament Bracket

See also
 Missouri Valley Conference

References 

2001–02 Missouri Valley Conference men's basketball season
Missouri Valley Conference men's basketball tournament